Zeme may refer to:

 Zemes māte, the  Slavic and Latvian goddess of the earth, identical to Lithuanian Žemyna
 Zeme, Lombardy, a village in Italy
 Zeme people, a Naga tribe of North-East India
 Zeme language, the Sino-Tibetan language spoken by the tribe
 Zeme languages, a group of languages that includes the Zeme language
 Zeme, a central character of the webseries 'Zeme N Deme'